Fernando José Cabrera (born November 16, 1981) is a Puerto Rican former professional baseball relief pitcher. He played in Major League Baseball (MLB) for the Cleveland Indians, Baltimore Orioles, and Boston Red Sox.

Career

Cleveland Indians
Cabrera was drafted by the Cleveland Indians in the 10th round of the 1999 Major League Baseball draft and signed in August 1999. He was selected to participate in the  All-Star Futures Game. He was designated for assignment by Cleveland on August 1, and was subsequently released on August 9.

Baltimore Orioles
The Tampa Bay Devil Rays claimed him off release waivers on August 13, and had five days to sign him or let Cabrera become a free agent. Cabrera decided to become a free agent and signed a minor league contract with the Baltimore Orioles on August 21, 2007. The Orioles recalled Cabrera in September 2007. He was placed on the 15-day disabled list by the Orioles at the beginning of the  season. On September 5, 2008, Cabrera was released by the Orioles.

Boston Red Sox
On January 27, he signed a minor league contract with the Boston Red Sox. He was called up to the Red Sox on August 9, 2009.

Oakland Athletics
He played with the Sacramento River Cats in the Oakland Athletics system in 2011.

New York Mets
On January 10, 2012, Cabrera signed with the New York Mets to a minor league deal.

Los Angeles Angels
On January 11, 2013, Cabrera signed a minor league deal with the Los Angeles Angels of Anaheim. He was assigned to the Salt Lake Bees, and he played a season for them before retiring.

International play
Cabrera played for Puerto Rico in the 2006, 2009 and 2013 World Baseball Classic. In 2009, he gave up the ninth-inning single to David Wright to allow Team USA to come back from a 5–4 deficit to win the game, eliminating Puerto Rico from the competition.

See also

 List of Major League Baseball players from Puerto Rico

References

External links

1981 births
Living people
People from Toa Baja, Puerto Rico
Major League Baseball pitchers
Major League Baseball players from Puerto Rico
Baseball players at the 2019 Pan American Games
Pan American Games gold medalists for Puerto Rico
Pan American Games medalists in baseball
Leones de Ponce players
Indios de Mayagüez players
Cangrejeros de Santurce (baseball) players
Burlington Indians players (1986–2006)
Columbus RedStixx players
Kinston Indians players
Akron Aeros players
Buffalo Bisons (minor league) players
Norfolk Tides players
Pawtucket Red Sox players
Sacramento River Cats players
Salt Lake Bees players
Cleveland Indians players
Baltimore Orioles players
Boston Red Sox players
2006 World Baseball Classic players
2009 World Baseball Classic players
2013 World Baseball Classic players
Medalists at the 2019 Pan American Games
Liga de Béisbol Profesional Roberto Clemente pitchers